The 2012 World Junior Wrestling Championships were the 36th edition of the World Junior Wrestling Championships and were held in Pattaya, Thailand between 4-9 September 2012.

Medal table

Medal summary

Men's freestyle

Greco-Roman

Women's freestyle

References

External links 
 UWW Database

World Junior Championships
International wrestling competitions hosted by Thailand
Sport in Thailand
Wrestling in Thailand
World Junior Wrestling Championships